The National Center for Integrative Biomedical Informatics (NCIBI) is one of seven National Centers for Biomedical Computing funded by the National Institutes of Health's (NIH) Roadmap for Medical Research. The center is based at the University of Michigan and is part of the Center for Computational Medicine and Bioinformatics.  NCIBI's mission is to create targeted knowledge environments for molecular biomedical research to help guide experiments and enable new insights from the analysis of complex diseases. It was established in October 2005.

The Center develops computational methods to effectively access and integrate biological data. Driving Biological Projects (DBPs) provide a starting point from which tool development is informed, launched, and tested. Current DBPs include gene fusion in cancers, major organ-specific complications of diabetes, nutrition and obesity, and co-morbid disease associations of bipolar disorder.  In addition to testing tools for function, a separate team is dedicated to testing usability and user interaction.

Once tools are developed and validated, the Center disseminates data and software throughout the University and the broader biomedical research community. Various mechanisms such as training videos, tutorials, and demonstrations and presentations at prominent scientific conferences are used to share NCIBI data and software nationally and internationally.

Available tools
In addition to the tools listed below, the enriched data contained in many NCIBI databases is available from the Databases tab on the Try Our Tools page.

Exploratory analysis

Conceptual literature searching

See also
Bioinformatics
Biomedical Informatics

Notes

References

External links
National Center for Integrative Biomedical Informatics homepage
Cytoscape

Genomics
Proteomics
Research institutes in Michigan
Medical research institutes in the United States
Bioinformatics organizations
National Institutes of Health
Medical and health organizations based in Michigan